"Mad World" is a 1982 song by Tears for Fears, covered by Michael Andrews and Gary Jules (2001) and others.

Mad World may also refer to:

 Mad World (film), a 2016 Hong Kong drama film directed by Wong Chun
 MAD World, the international network of MAD TV
 MadWorld, a 2009 video game
 "Mad World" (Hardwell song), 2015
 "Mad World", a song by Krokus from Rock the Block
 "Mad World", a song by Within Temptation from Resist
 Mad World: Evelyn Waugh and the Secrets of Brideshead, a 2010 book by Paula Byrne
 "Madworld", a fictional location in the 1979 Star Trek novel Trek to Madworld

See also
 A Mad World, My Masters, a 1605 play by Thomas Middleton
 It's a Mad, Mad, Mad, Mad World, a 1963 American comedy film
 It's a Mad, Mad, Mad World, a 1987 Hong Kong comedy film and film series
 Mad Mad World, a 1991 album by Tom Cochrane
 Mad Mad World (TV series), an ITV panel show
 Mad, Mad World Tour, a 2012 concert tour by Meat Loaf
 Mad at the World, a Christian rock band